Ernest George Meers (1849 – 20 August 1928) was an English tennis player, organist and gum merchant.

Biography
Meers was born in Kingsnorth, near Ashford, Kent. He earned a Bachelor of Music from Queen's College, Oxford and was later chairman and managing director of Watts Ltd, gummakers. He married Eliza Rose, daughter of Captain Henry Douglas-Hart of the Madras Army, who was assassinated while serving in India in 1858. They had three sons and two daughters who survived him.

Tennis career
His played first tournament at the North of England Championships in Scarborough in 1884 going out in the round of 16. He reached his first final at Sittingbourne in 1885 losing to Ernest Wool Lewis. Meers played at the Wimbledon Championships between 1890 and 1895, reaching the quarterfinals of the all-comers competition in 1894 and the semifinals in 1895. He reached the semifinals of the U.S. National Championships in 1889 and won the British Covered Court Championships in 1892. His other singles successes included winning the British Covered Court Championships indoors on hard wood courts in 1891. He won the Kent Championships on grass three times (1888, 1890–91). In addition he also won three titles at the Essex Championships (1887–88, 1890) and the Middlesex Championships onetime in 1891. He played his last tournament at the British Covered Court Championships in 1896 going out in the quarter-finals.

References

1849 births
1928 deaths
People from the Borough of Ashford
19th-century male tennis players
Alumni of The Queen's College, Oxford
English classical organists
English male tennis players
Tennis people from Kent
British male tennis players